Arapaho Pass, elevation , is a mountain pass that crosses the Continental Divide in the Front Range of the Rocky Mountains of Colorado in the United States.

References

Landforms of Boulder County, Colorado
Landforms of Grand County, Colorado
Mountain passes of Colorado
Great Divide of North America